The 2010 Indian Premier League season, abbreviated as IPL 3 or the 2010 IPL, was the third season of the Indian Premier League, established by the Board of Control for Cricket in India (BCCI) in 2007. The tournament was hosted by India and had an estimated television audience of more than 200 million people in the country. It was played between 12 March and 25 April 2010. It was also the first ever cricket tournament that was broadcast live on YouTube. The final four matches of the tournament were screened in 3D across movie halls in India. The tagline was Saare jahan se achha (a tribute to India).

The tournament was won by the Chennai Super Kings, who defeated the Mumbai Indians in the final played at Mumbai. The purple cap went to Pragyan Ojha of Deccan Chargers, while the orange cap and the player of the tournament award were awarded to Sachin Tendulkar of the Mumbai Indians. Saurabh Tiwary was declared the U-23 success of the tournament, while the Chennai Super Kings won the Fair Play.

Venues
Five new venues were introduced for the third edition of IPL. These included Nagpur, Cuttack, Mumbai, Ahmedabad, and Dharamsala. Nagpur, Cuttack and Mumbai amongst them hosted the home games for Deccan Chargers, and Ahmedabad and Dharamsala shared some of the home matches of Rajasthan Royals and Kings XI Punjab respectively. Additionally, Hyderabad, which hosted all Deccan's home games in 2008, did not host any games this season. This was attributed to the possibility of unrest due to a Telangana state succession.

The 60-game tournament also featured a third-place playoff between the losing semi-finalists as a qualifier for the Champions League and also saw the induction of ICL players. Both semi-finals were scheduled to be hosted in Bangalore but instead were played in Mumbai. The final and the third place playoff games were played at Mumbai and the season ended five days before the World Twenty20 in West Indies.

Security concerns
On 17 April, before the match between Royal Challengers Bangalore & Mumbai Indians started 2 bombs went off at M. Chinnaswamy Stadium in Bangalore, while another was defused. The game on the day did continue, however, after an hour's delay. As a consequence both semi-finals were moved out of the city to DY Patil Stadium in Navi Mumbai. A third device was defused on 18 April 2010. All three devices were hidden in the stadium's perimeter wall and the two explosions were believed to have injured 15 people. Initial investigations suggested that the explosives used in the devices were locally made and were of low intensity. Former cricketers Sir Ian Botham, Brian Lara, Steve Waugh, and Shaun Pollock urged the players not to give in to terrorism by opting out of the league.

Player auction

11 players were sold at the player auction held on 19 January 2010 in Mumbai. This was from a list of 97 registered players, which was then shortlisted to 66. West Indian all rounder Kieron Pollard and New Zealand fast bowler Shane Bond were the highest bid players in the auction who were bought for $750,000 but not before their prices went in the silent tie breaker round. Kieron Pollard was bought by Mumbai Indians and Shane Bond by Kolkata Knight Riders.

Rules and regulations
The rules and format were the same as the previous season with the exception of the strategic timeout. Each innings had two mandatory timeouts of two-and-a-half minutes each. The fielding captain must take one at the end of over six, seven, eight or nine, and the batsmen at the end of over 13, 14, 15 or 16. Points in the group stage were awarded as follows:

According to rules, if a match ended with the scores tied, the tie is broken with a one-over-per-side Super Over. The rules of the Super Over are as set out in the ICC Standard Twenty20 International match playing conditions (1 October 2009 version).

 Team with most runs wins
 If equal, the team with most number of boundary sixes throughout the entire match wins
 If still equal, the team with most number of boundaries throughout the entire match wins
 If still equal, the team taking the most wickets throughout the entire match wins
 If still equal, a count-back from the final ball of the Super Over eliminator shall be conducted. The team with the higher scoring delivery shall be the winner.
 If still equal, by coin toss.

Teams and standings

League table

League stage

Playoffs

Semi-finals

Third place playoff

Final

Results

Group stage

Statistics

Most runs

The leading run scorer of the league phase wore an orange cap when fielding.
Full Table on Cricinfo

Bowling

Most wickets

The leading wicket taker of the league phase wore a purple cap when fielding.
Full Table on cricinfo

References

External links
 Official Website
 Tournament website on ESPN Cricinfo

 
Indian Premier League seasons